Sangli is a city and the district headquarters of Sangli District in the state of Maharashtra, in western India. It is known as the Turmeric City of Maharashtra due to its production and trade of the spice. Sangli is situated on the banks of river Krishna and houses many sugar factories.
Sangli is a major city in Western India 390 km from Mumbai, 240 km from Pune, 50 km from Kolhapur, and 653 km from Bangalore. Sangli is known for its turmeric trade, grapes and the largest number of sugar factories in India. The only district has more than 30 sugar factories. Sangli Miraj Kupwad, along with its Urban Agglomeration together known as Sangli Miraj Kupwad Metropolitan Region (SMKMR).

Sangli UA/Metropolitan is one of the biggest city in Maharashtra and 93rd biggest in India. Sangli UA/Metropolitan Region has developed itself as a modern city with broader roads, major railway junction, Malls & Multiplexes, hotels with multi-cuisine and very good education facilities. The city has a major healthcare hub including its twin City Miraj. Sangli-Miraj combined has more than 900+ Hospitals and Clinics, making it one of the India's largest emerging medical hub and also emerging international hub for the patients from Oman, Sweden, Canada, Yemen, Kuwait. It is also a major city with telecommunication and entertainment facilities. A Software Technology Park is being set up in a prime location of the city. Nearby cities like Ichalkaranji and Jaysingpur are now emerging as Satellite city to Sangli UA/Metropolitan Area. Sangli has the largest sugar factory in Asia and most number of sugar factories in India as well. Krishna Valley wine Park is another leading wine park in India. Sangli is world's leading Global hub for Turmeric Trade. Sangli is also known as Chess City of India Now Sangli city is emerging as yellow city
of India .

Geography
Sangli city is situated on the bank of Krishna river, the valley and tributaries of which offer many irrigation and agricultural advantages that drive the economy of the district and the city. Other small rivers, such as the Warana River and the Panchganga, flow into Krishna River.

History

The region, known as Kundal (now a small village 40 km away from Sangli city) in medieval India, was the capital of the Chalukya Empire in the 12th century AD. During the time of Chhatrapati Shivaji Maharaj, Sangli, Miraj and surrounding areas were captured from the Mughal Empire. Until 1801, Sangli was included in Miraj Jahagir. Sangli separated from Miraj in 1801, following a family quarrel between Chintamanrao Patwardhan, and his paternal uncle, Gangadharrao Patwardhan, who had succeeded his childless elder brother as the sixth chief of Miraj in 1782.

Sangli is notable for the Brindavana (tomb) of Satyavrata Tirtha, a saint of Dvaita Order of Vedanta and Peetadipathi of Uttaradi Math who took  Samadhi in Sangli in the year 1638.

Etymology
The city's original name was Sahagalli—from the Marathi words saha ("six") and galli ("lanes") describing the early street plan—which was later shortened to Sangli.

Culture

Food
 
'Bhadang' also known as flavoured rice puff, Bhadang from sangli is world famous and are exported in USA, UK, Canada, And Southeast Asia.   
'Bharala Wangi'also known as stuffed brinjal with bhakri is most famous food from sangli.

Educational institutes
Education institutions in the area, aside from schools, 

Government Medical College And Hospital Miraj

include engineering colleges such as 
Gov College Walchand College of Engineering

RIT college Sakhrale, Islampur,
Padmabhooshan Vasantraodada Patil Institute of Technology,
Kbp College
Annasaheb Dange College of Engineering & Technology. Government Medical College, Miraj, is also present, as is the 
Willingdon College of Arts & Science at Vishrambaug Prakash Institute of Medical Science and research Islampur Sangli, Bharati Vidyapeeth Deemed University Medical College and Hospital,a college constituting under Bharati Vidyapeeth - Sangli, Miraj.Appasaheb Birnale College of Architecture, South Shivaji Nagar, Sangli. Nav Krishna Valley School in Miraj as well as Podar International School. 
St.Alphonsa School in Miraj.

KWC College of Arts&Science

Architecture
 Ganapati Temple sangli, located on the banks of river Krishna.
 The Irwin Bridge, built by the British.
 A royal palace (Rajwada).
 Mai ghat, Sangli.
 Aamrai garden, Sangli.
 New Collector office, Vishrambaug.
 Centuries-old Digambar Jain Mandir at Arag (Recently partially conserved)
Audumber datta temple(20km from sangli)
Dandoba hills
Sagreshwar national park

Climate

Sangli has a semi-arid climate with three seasons. Summer takes place from the middle of February to the middle of June, characterised by largely dry conditions towards the start, with rainfall tending to increase as the season progresses. Temperatures in summer are largely characterised by hot days and mild nights. Monsoon takes place from the middle of June to late October. Rainfall is most common in this season than at any other time of year. Temperatures in the monsoon season are characterised by warm, humid days and mild, humid nights. Winter takes place from early November to early February. This season is largely dry, with rain mostly concentrated in November. Temperatures in winter are characterised by warm days and cool nights. The total rainfall is around 22 inches (580 mm).

References

 
Cities and towns in Sangli district
Cities in Maharashtra